{{Infobox writer 
| image            = 
| imagesize        = 150px|
| name             = Anuradha Sharma Pujari
| caption          = 
| pseudonym        = 
| birth_date       = 1964
| birth_place      = Jorhat, Assam, India
| death_date       = 
| death_place      = 
| occupation       = Author, Journalist, Poet
| nationality      = Indian
| period           = 1997–present.
| genre            = Assamese literature
| subject          = 
| movement         = 
| notableworks     = The Heart's a Showbiz, In Search of a God, Kanchan (book)Kanchan, Autograph (autobiography)Autograph, Yat Ekhon Aranya Asi (Novel)
| influences       = 
| influenced       = 
| awards           = Sahitya Akademi Award (2021)
| signature        = অনুৰাধা শৰ্মাপূজাৰীৰ চহী.jpg
| website          = 
}}

Anuradha Sharma Pujari (Assamese: অনুৰাধা শৰ্মা পূজাৰী) (born 1964) is an Assamese journalist and author. She is the editor of Sadin and Satsori. Her contributions to Assamese literature include fiction and essays. She lives in Panjabari, Guwahati. Her first novel is Hriday Ek Bigyapan.

Early life
Born in Jorhat, she studied sociology at the Dibrugarh University, and journalism at the Birla Institute of Liberal Arts and Management Sciences, Kolkata. She gained popularity with her column in Letters from Kolkata in Asom Bani weekly and fame with her novel The Heart's a Showbiz. First published in 1998, it was hailed by Homen Borgohain as a contemporary classic. His review said it raised some basic questions about modern Assamese life that no other writer had raised before. The novel went on to printings of 14 editions.

Professional career
The author was the guest of honour at National bravery award presentation hosted by the Indian Council for Child Welfare, Assam, in collaboration with Ladies' and Children's Recreation Centre and the Kamrup District Council for Child Welfare at Hem Sishu Sadan in Guwahati. Anuradha Sharma Pujari's Hridoi Ek Bigyapan was, along with Amritjyoti Mahanta's first novel Adhagara Mahanogoror Probashi, one of only two novels in Assamese "that deals with the glamorous world of media and communication in all its complexities".

Anuradha Sarma Pujari (born 1964) has been called "one of the most popular writers of this generation", and her work described as traversing "the varied textures of human conflict" and covering the tension between the society and the individual including explorations of femininity and "the gaps that exist between people in a relationship".

Bibliography

Novels
 Hridoy Ek Bigyapon (The Heart's a Showbiz), 1998.
 Ejon Eshworor Sondhanot (In Search of a God), 1998.
 Kanchan (novel), 2001. The novel depicts the life of a girl named kanchan who is incessantly cheated and sexually harassed by some narrow minded men folk.
 Sahebpurar Borosun (Rains of Sahebpura), 2003. This novel brings to light an adventurous journey of social workers specially in a village named sahebpura.
 Boragee Nodir Ghat (The Banks of Boragee River), 2004.
 Nahoror Niribili Cha (Shadows of Nahor), 2005. This can be termed as the diary of the writer while she was reading in Dibrugarh university. The characters she met and all the events that occurred on these two years are clearly mentioned in the book.
 Raag-Anurag,ৰাগ অনুৰাগ 2007.
 Mereng, 2010. The story of a strong woman named mereng or Indira Miri. 
 Son Harinor Chekur( Race of the golden deer),2012. This book is dedicated to the youths who are very serious and tensed about their career and often commit suicide when they failed. Life is a very interesting journey. It is too precious to be idled away. The book gives the message that the youths should dedicate themselves to what they like. Live every moment. Don't die before your death. 
 Nil Prajapati (Blue Butterflies), 2013. This book is full with many small problems and love between couples.
 Jalachabi, (2014). This book depicts how the problem of Alzheimer creates gap between old parents and their children.

Short story collections
 Boxontor Gaan (Spring-song), 1999.
 Ejon Oxamajik Kobir Biography (An Unsocial Poet's Biography), 2001
 Catherinor Soite Eti Nirjon Duporia (An Afternoon with Catherine), 2005
 No Man's Land (short story collection)Autobiographical non-fiction
 Kolikotar Cithi (Letters from Calcutta), 1999.
 Diary, 2001.
 Autograph, 2004.
 American Charaikhanat Sanbad Basanta aru Bandhu(essays)
 Alop Chinta Alop Gadya (Editoials Collection)
 Priya Manuh : Priya Katha'', 2013

Awards
She won the Sahitya Akademi Award 2021 for her novel 'Yat Ekhon Aranya Asil'.

References

External links
 Op-Ed : Bharat Ratna and Sachin Tendulkar
 eBooks of Anuradha Sharma Pujari

Poets from Assam
People from Jorhat district
1964 births
Living people
Novelists from Assam
Dibrugarh University alumni
Assamese-language poets
Journalists from Assam
Indian autobiographers
20th-century Indian short story writers
20th-century Indian novelists
20th-century Indian poets
Women writers from Assam
20th-century Indian women writers
Indian women journalists
Indian women novelists
Indian women poets
Indian women short story writers
21st-century Indian women writers
21st-century Indian novelists
Women autobiographers
Recipients of the Sahitya Akademi Award in Assamese